In differential geometry, the term curvature tensor may refer to:
 the Riemann curvature tensor of a Riemannian manifold — see also Curvature of Riemannian manifolds;
 the curvature of an affine connection or covariant derivative (on tensors);
 the curvature form of an Ehresmann connection: see Ehresmann connection, connection (principal bundle) or connection (vector bundle). It is the one of the numbers that are important in the Einstein field equations.

See also
Tensor (disambiguation)